Taran Wanderer (1967) is a high fantasy novel by American writer Lloyd Alexander, the fourth of five volumes in The Chronicles of Prydain. The series follows Taran, the Assistant Pig-Keeper, as he nears manhood while helping to resist the forces of Arawn Death-Lord.

The story follows Taran as he "wanders" with Gurgi, but without most of his former companions from the other Chronicles. He searches for his noble or common lineage in the eastern regions of Prydain, far from both the realm and forces of Arawn and the demesne of the High King.
Along the way, he meets many people, learns new skills and crafts, and confronts some rough characters.

According to the author, "he learns to reshape his life out of his own inner resources, for there must not only be an end to childhood but also a beginning of manhood."

Origins
The series was inspired by Welsh mythology and by the castles, scenery, and language of Wales, which the author experienced during World War II army combat intelligence training.

All of the proper names in Prydain are historical or mythological. A few elements of Taran Wanderer have a Welsh basis but are more universal, such as "Morda's life secret" and the three crones the Norns, the Moirae, or Triple Goddess.

At one stage, it would conclude with a fourth book entitled The High King of Prydain. The editor felt that something was missing between the third and fourth volumes, so Taran Wanderer was written one month after The Castle of Llyr was published.

Plot summary 
Taran and Gurgi have returned to Caer Dallben after leaving Princess Eilonwy at the royal court of Dinas Rhydnant for education in the ways of a princess. Taran has come to realize that he loves Eilonwy; but although he has proven his worth as a man, he is restless and determined to know his parentage, partly in hopes that noble birth will support a marriage proposal. Dallben the enchanter tells him nothing about his heritage, but gives his approval for Taran and Gurgi to travel on their own in search of an answer. Taran and Gurgi travel first to the Marshes of Morva to ask the witches Orddu, Orwen and Orgoch. Taran has nothing of great value to give in exchange, so Orddu merely tells him of an alternative: that the Mirror of Llunet in the far east Llawgadarn Mountains will show him who he is.

Taran sets out to Cantrev Cadiffor to be outfitted by King Smoit. After a border patrol of Smoit's vassal, Lord Goryon, steals his horse Melynlas and Gurgi's pony, they spend the night with the farm couple Aeddan and Alarca who have lost their son and livestock. Taran is welcomed to remain, but he gently declines and leaves with new respect for common farmers. Taran and Gurgi recover their steeds at Goryon's fortress because Melynlas will have no other rider, and Goryon is relieved to escape the burden of mastering him. At the neighboring stronghold of Lord Gast, they meet their old friend Fflewddur Fflam, who has returned to wandering as a bard, and together they go on to Caer Cadarn, where Smoit welcomes them.

Goryon and Gast have been feuding over their cattle stock for years, especially over Cornillo, an exceptional cow. When their dispute breaks out again the next day, Cornillo and the combined cattle herds of the two lords run off. After they recover the herd, Taran persuades King Smoit to resort to a wiser judgment to settle the continual dispute: The rival cantrev lords shall resow the fields of Aeddan, which have been ruined by their feud, and Cornillo is given to Aeddan as further compensation, although the lords shall have her next calves. The childless widower Smoit later offers to adopt Taran as his son and future King of Cadiffor. Taran declines, but says he will gladly accept if he discovers noble birth.

Continuing eastward, they cross the river Ystrad. Taran's pet crow Kaw reveals the hiding place of a polished bone the size of a toothpick, which has been stashed high in a tree. Fflewddur's mount Llyan, a giant cat, brings a green and yellow frog, who is really their old friend Doli the dwarf. Doli has been transformed during his investigation of a deadly threat to the Fair Folk: A human wizard named Morda has attained the power to enchant them, and to raid their underground realms. Taran, Gurgi and Fflewddur investigate Morda's abode, but are all captured. Morda begins to boast to his captives, explaining that during a winter many years ago, he was sought out by the enchantress Angharad, who was searching for her kidnapped daughter Eilonwy, but left her to die from exhaustion. Among her possessions, Morda found an amulet, a gift to her from the Fair Folk which became the primary source of his power, and an empty book, which he gave to Glew when the latter begged him to make him a sorcerer.

Morda turns Fflewddur and Gurgi into a hare and a mouse, respectively, but fails to transform Taran. Taran deduces that the bone splinter Kaw found is Morda's little finger, in which he has stored his own life force to attain immortality and then cut off of his hand to keep it safe, and that Morda is unable to harm Taran so long as he possesses it. As Taran and Morda struggle over the bone, Morda inadvertently snaps it, causing his own death and ending the spell which transformed the companions. After recovering Angharad's amulet, Taran reflects that it could make him powerful, but decides to return it to Doli's people, the Fair Folk, who made it. Just before they part ways, Doli identifies the ceremonial horn Eilonwy recovered from the ruins of Caer Colur, which Taran still carries with him, as a magical item with which Taran can issue one single call for aid from the Fair Folk.

Taran, Gurgi, and Fflewddur camp next with the ruffian Dorath and his band. Their hosts suspect a quest for treasure and offer guidance to Llunet, in exchange for a share. The guests try to slip away early next morning, but Dorath prevents it and extracts a wager on hand-to-hand combat with Taran. He cheats and takes Taran's sword, then departs.

An old shepherd with decrepit holdings, Craddoc, welcomes the companions next. From Taran's account of the mission, Craddoc reveals that Taran is, in fact, his son. Fflewddur departs, but Taran and Gurgi remain and labor beside Craddoc. Taran and Craddoc develop a bond, but Taran also resents the end of his dream of noble birth. During the next winter, however, Craddoc suffers a bad fall down a mountain gorge and Taran is unable to rescue him. Near death, Craddoc reveals that he merely posed as Taran's father to gain himself a son. The gorge and the weather threaten Taran as well, and he finally summons the Fair Folk, who are able to save only Taran and Gurgi.

After burying Craddoc, Taran and Gurgi continue eastward, across Little Avren to the Free Commots, and stay for a while with lucky Llonio and his family on the banks of the river. Next, Taran assists and learns the trades of three great craftmasters: Hevydd the smith, Dwyvach the weaver, and Annlaw the potter. He learns enough that he would be welcome to remain as an assistant, and gains a new sword, a new cloak, and a new bowl, but still cannot find fulfillment. While ferrying the wares of Annlaw to Commot Isav, he leads the poor farming village in resistance of a raid by Dorath, killing half the band at no loss of life on the farmers' side.

Upon Taran's return, Annlaw tells him the way to the Mirror of Llunet, which he knows about, but has never visited. After a short journey, Taran and Gurgi find the Mirror: a pool of water at the mouth of a cave beyond the Lake of Llunet. Taran gazes into it, but Dorath interrupts and defiles the pool. He and Taran meet in a swordfight, in which Taran's old sword shatters on his new one and Dorath flees. Taran does not pursue but returns to Annlaw, whom he tells that the Mirror showed his own reflection and nothing more. He does not feel cheated by Orddu, for he has seen what he has become by his own labor and all he has learned on the way. With new confidence in himself, he and Gurgi depart back to Caer Dallben.

Notes

References

Citations

*

1967 American novels
1967 fantasy novels
American children's novels
American fantasy novels
Children's fantasy novels
Novels by Lloyd Alexander
The Chronicles of Prydain novels
Sequel novels
Henry Holt and Company books
Pigs in literature
1967 children's books
Dwarves in popular culture